The Land Forces, also called the Congolese Army, are the land warfare component and the largest branch of the Armed Forces of the Democratic Republic of the Congo (FARDC). 

The current Congolese army has its origins in the Force Publique that was active in the Belgian Congo, which was renamed the Congolese National Army (Armée nationale congolaise, ANC) when the country gained independence from Belgium in 1960. During the regime of Mobutu Sese Seko, it was renamed the Armed Forces of Zaire (Forces Armées Zaïroises, FAZ) in 1971 with the country's name change from Congo to Zaire. Under Mobutu's leadership the FAZ was used to put down various rebellions but was deliberately kept weak to prevent any possible coup, resulting in its collapse in the face of Laurent Kabila's AFDL rebel movement during the First Congo War (1996–1997). After Kabila's overthrow of Mobutu the former FAZ troops and various rebels that supported him were in no condition to fight the invasion by Rwandan-backed militant groups during the Second Congo War (1998–2003) and largely collapsed.

The peace agreement signed in 2002 initiated the process of uniting former rebel groups in a national army, the Forces du Terrestres of the FARDC, reorganizing them into multiple brigades. Although some progress has been made the army remains hampered by corruption as well as low and infrequent pay, which led to Land Forces troops committing numerous crimes against civilians. Since the end of the Second Congo War the army remains engaged with dozens of armed rebel groups throughout the country, most notably in the eastern province of North Kivu, near the border with Rwanda. There have also been multiple border clashes between Congolese troops and the Rwandan Army.

History
The land forces are made up of about 14 integrated brigades, of fighters from all the former warring factions which have gone through an brassage integration process (see next paragraph), and a not-publicly known number of non-integrated brigades which remain solely made up from single factions (the Congolese Rally for Democracy (RCD)'s Armee National Congolaise, the ex-government former Congolese Armed Forces (FAC), the ex-RCD KML, the ex-Movement for the Liberation of Congo, the armed groups of the Ituri conflict (the Mouvement des Révolutionnaires Congolais (MRC), Forces de Résistance Patriotique d'Ituri (FRPI) and the Front Nationaliste Intégrationniste (FNI)) and the Mai-Mai).

It appears that about the same time that Presidential Decree 03/042 of 18 December 2003 established the National Commission for Demobilisation and Reinsertion (CONADER), '..all ex-combatants were officially declared as FARDC soldiers and the then FARDC brigades [were to] rest deployed until the order to leave for brassage.

The reform plan adopted in 2005 envisaged the formation of eighteen integrated brigades through the brassage process as its first of three stages. The process consists firstly of regroupment, where fighters are disarmed. Then they are sent to orientation centres, run by CONADER, where fighters take the choice of either returning to civilian society or remaining in the armed forces. Combatants who choose demobilization receive an initial cash payment of US $110. Those who choose to stay within the FARDC are then transferred to one of six integration centres for a 45-day training course, which aims to build integrated formations out of factional fighters previously heavily divided along ethnic, political and regional lines. The centres are spread out around the country at Kitona, Kamina, Kisangani, Rumangabo and Nyaleke (within the Virunga National Park) in Nord-Kivu, and Luberizi (on the border with Burundi) in South Kivu. The process has suffered severe difficulties due to construction delays, administration errors, and the amount of travel former combatants have to do, as the three stages' centres are widely separated. Following the first 18 integrated brigades, the second goal is the formation of a ready reaction force of two to three brigades, and finally, by 2010 when MONUC is anticipated to have withdrawn, the creation of a Main Defence Force of three divisions.

In February 2008, the current reform plan was described as:
"The short term, 2008–2010, will see the setting in place of a Rapid Reaction Force; the medium term, 2008–2015, with a Covering Force; and finally the long term, 2015–2020, with a Principal Defence Force." He added that the reform plan rests on a programme of synergy based on the four pillars of dissuasion, production, reconstruction and excellence. "The Rapid Reaction Force is expected to focus on dissuasion, through a Rapid Reaction Force of 12 battalions, capable of aiding MONUC to secure the east of the country and to realise constitutional missions," Defence Minister Chikez Diemu said.

Amid the other difficulties in building new armed forces for the DRC, in early 2007 the integration and training process was distorted as the DRC government under Kabila attempted to use it to gain more control over the dissident general Laurent Nkunda. A hastily negotiated verbal agreement in Rwanda saw three government FAC brigades integrated with Nkunda's former ANC 81st and 83rd Brigades in what was called mixage. Mixage brought multiple factions into composite brigades, but without the 45-day retraining provided by brassage, and it seems that actually, the process was limited to exchanging battalions between the FAC and Nkunda brigades in North Kivu, without further integration. Due to Nkunda's troops having greater cohesion, Nkunda effectively gained control of all five brigades - not what the DRC central government had been hoping! However, after Nkunda used the mixage brigades to fight the FDLR, strains arose between the FARDC and Nkunda-loyalist troops within the brigades and they fell apart in the last days of August 2007. The International Crisis Group says that 'by 30 August [2007] Nkunda's troops had left the mixed brigades and controlled a large part of the Masisi and Rutshuru territories' (of North Kivu).

Both formally integrated brigades and the non-integrated units continue to conduct arbitrary arrests, rapes, robbery, and other crimes and these human rights violations are "regularly" committed by both officers and members of the rank and file. Members of the Army also often strike deals to gain access to resources with the militias they are meant to be fighting.

The various brigades and other formations and units number at least 100,000 troops. The status of these brigades has been described as "pretty chaotic." A 2007 disarmament and repatriation study said "army units that have not yet gone through the process of brassage are usually much smaller than what they ought to be. Some non-integrated brigades have only 500 men (and are thus nothing more than a small battalion) whereas some battalions may not even have the size of a normal company (over a 100 men)."

In 2015, three hundred FARDC special forces troops were deployed in northern Katanga to prevent inter-ethnic violence between Mbuti and Bantu locals.

Organization

Original structure
See also U.S. State Department, 07KINSHASA452 Congolese Military Proposes Redeployment, Renaming Of Integrated Brigades, 19 April 2007. Like the Force Publique in the Congo Free State, FARDC brigades have been deploying to their areas of operation with their families in tow. 2nd Commando Battalion of the Belgian Paracommando Brigade trained one of the first integrated brigades from January to June 2004. As of 13 September 2006, the Government had established 13 out of the 18 integrated brigades it had planned to create before the elections. (S/2006/759, 21 September 2006, 12) A fourteenth brigade was created by March 2007. (S/2007/156, 20 March 2007, 7)

1st Brigade (integrated), Belgium began training this brigade in Kisangani on 9 February 2004, graduated June 2004. Human rights reports in April and August 2007 place the Brigade in the Mahagi territory, Ituri area, Orientale Province. At Bavi, 30 km south of Bunia, between August and November 2006 forty civilians were slaughtered and buried in three different graves by soldiers of the 1st integrated Brigade.
2nd Brigade (integrated), trained by Angola at Kitona. ordered to move to North Kivu from Kinshasa, February 2006. (06KINSHASA178, 2 February 2006) Butembo, North Kivu, 28 July 2007 See also U.S. State Department, 06KINSHASA629 North Kivu: Struggling to Survive in Rutshuru Territory, 20 April 2006.
3rd Brigade (integrated), trained by Belgium and South Africa at Kamina. Graduated 1 June 2005. (05KINSHASA950, 10 June 2005) In the Bukavu area, late March 2007 (now 101st Brigade)
4th Brigade (integrated), training process finished [Monday] c.23 August 2005, then under the command of Colonel Willy Bonané RCD-G), a Tutsi officer close to Governor Eugene Serufuli, and was dispatched to Ituri. (ICG Africa Report 108, 27 April 2006, p. 16, and IRIN, Former militiamen now form army's 4th Brigade, 23 August 2005) Cholera broke out amongst the brigade, Aug-Sept 2005. Elements reported at Lopa, Ituri area, 24–25 July 2007
5th Brigade (integrated), deployed to North Kivu in August–September 2005. See ICG Africa Report 108, 27 April 2006, p. 16. "In January [2006], tensions escalated after human rights abuses were committed by soldiers of the FARDC 5th integrated brigade against Kinyarwanda speakers in Rutshuru territory. Insurgents belonging to the Laurent Nkunda militia, with elements of the 83rd brigade, attacked the FARDC 5th integrated brigade. They subsequently took over Rwindi and Kibrizi, prompting the withdrawal of FARDC from Rutshuru to Kanyabayonga. On 21 January, MONUC launched operations and successfully cleared Rwindi and Kibrizi of rebel elements." Brigade now at Kananga, Kasai-Occidental. See also U.S. State Department, 06KINSHASA481, 23 March 2006.
6th Brigade (integrated),  said that 'the sixth and last brigade from the first phase of army integration is expected to be ready for deployment in late September' [2005]. Located Jiba, Ituri area, Orientale Province, May 2007 Ordered to leave Ituri for North Kivu for offensive against Laurent Nkunda, June 2007.
7th Brigade (integrated), finished forming Kitona March 2006. On 3 May 2006, it was reported that 'elements such as the 7th Integrated Brigade are still taking up space at the Rumangabu brassage center (North Kivu), for instance, and because they have not been fully deployed to Luberu (North Kivu), it isn't possible for the next group of soldiers to arrive at Rumangabu for integration.' (State Department,06KINSHASA711, SSR: Blockages Remain, 8 May 2006) Stationed in Maluku, Kinshasa August 2006 Elements of this brigade at Bolobo, Bandundu province, May 2007.
8th Brigade (integrated), Elements at Luberizi & Luvungi, in South Kivu, May 2007.
9th Brigade (integrated), North Kivu. Involved in a 5 August 2006, firefight between the 94th Battalion (of the 9th Integrated Brigade) against the 834th Battalion (of the non-integrated 83rd Brigade), at Sake, North Kivu.
10th Brigade (integrated), headquartered at Gemena, Equateur, 31 August 2007. (07KINSHASA1033, 31 August 2007) Deployed to the Dongo crisis in October 2009, suffering two defeats at the hands of Odjani Mangbama's forces. (Congo Siasa)
12th Brigade (integrated), HQ at Baraka, South Kivu
13th Brigade (integrated), Marabo, North Kivu, mid June 2007. Second battalion of this brigade in process of formation near Bunia mid August 2007.
14th Brigade (integrated), Kalima, South Kivu, May 2007, now numbered 105th Brigade. Africa Confidential reported in January 2008 that the brigade was a part of a 25,000 strong government attack on 4,000 of Laurent Nkunda's soldiers in December 2007, but was beaten back, with the loss of its 'entire arms and equipment.' Human Rights Watch's 'Soldiers Who Rape, Commanders Who Condone: Sexual Violence and Military Reform in the Democratic Republic of Congo,' July 2009, is a detailed study of this brigade's history and crimes.
15th Brigade (integrated) (waiting for deployment as of 30 May 2007, with 2,837 men assigned. Ordered to leave Kisangani for North Kivu for offensive against Laurent Nkunda, June, and then routed by Nkunda troops in the Sake area, early September 2007.
16th and 17th Brigades (integrated)(beginning 'brassage' integration process as of 30 May 2007, both over 4,000 strong at the beginning of the process) 17th Bde was later referred to in the Oxfam report 'Waking the Devil,' as well as later being in the Luhago/Kabona localities of Kabare territoire.
18th Brigade

103rd Brigade (integrated)—previously designated 11th Brigade. Elements reported at Walungu, 110 km SW of Bukavu, South Kivu in the course of rape allegation 27 March 2007.

Updates in 2014
In September 2014, President Kabila reshuffled the command structure and in addition to military regions created three new 'defense zones' which would be subordinated directly to the general staff. The defense zones essentially created a new layer between the general staff and the provincial commanders. The military regions themselves were reorganized and do not correspond with the ones that existed prior to the reshuffle. A Congolese military analyst based in Brussels, Jean-Jacques Wondo, provided an outline of the updated command structure of the FARDC following the shake up of the high command:

1st Defense Zone (Bas Congo, Bandundu, Equatuer, and Kinshasa): Brig. Gen. Gabriel Amisi Kumba
11th Military Region (Bandundu Province): Gen. Dieudonné Kiamata Mutupeke
12th Military Region (Bas-Congo Province): Gen. Jonas Padiri Muhizi
13th Military Region (Equatuer Province): Gen. Luboya Kashama Djuni
14th Military Region (Kinshasa): Brig. Gen. Camille Bombele Luwala
2nd Defense Zone (Kasai and Katanga): Maj. Gen. Jean Claude Kifwa
21st Military Region (Kasai-Oriental and Kasai Occidental Provinces): Gen. Fall Jikabwe
22nd Military Region (Katanga Province): Philemon Yav
3rd Defense Zone (Kivu, Maneima, and Katanga): Maj. Gen. Leon Mush ale Tsipamba
31st Military Region (Bas-Uele and Tshopo Districts): Gen. Bertin Baseka Kamangala
32nd Military Region (Haut-Uele and Ituri Districts): Gen. Jean-Pierre Bunguabele
33rd Military Region (Maneima and South Kivu Provinces): Gen. Gaetan Kakudji Bobo
34th Military Region (North Kivu Province): Maj. Gen. Emmanuel Lombe

Chiefs of staff
Several known officers held the post of chief of land forces staff.
Sylvain Buki (2003—2006)
Gabriel Amisi Kumba (2006—2012)
François Olenga (2012—2014)
Dieudonné Banze Lubundji (2014—present)

Foreign assistance
A number of outside donor countries are also carrying out separate training programmes for various parts of the Forces du Terrestres (Land Forces). The People's Republic of China has trained Congolese troops at Kamina in Katanga from at least 2004 to 2009, and the Belgian government is training at least one 'rapid reaction' battalion. 

When Kabila visited U.S. President George W. Bush in Washington D.C., he also asked the U.S. Government to train a battalion, and as a result, a private contractor, Protection Strategies Incorporated, started training a FARDC light infantry battalion at Camp Base, Kisangani, in February 2010. The unit of 750 Congolese soldiers would become known as the 391st Commando Battalion. The company was supervised by U.S. Special Operations Command Africa. The battalion was trained in small unit tactics, communications, medical care, and food production to sustain itself. 

However, in 2013, during the M23 rebel advance in eastern Congo, several members of the 391st Commando Battalion were found to have committed mass rape against civilian women fleeing from the warzone, and other atrocities.

Republican Guard

In addition to the other land forces, President Joseph Kabila also has a Republican Guard presidential force, formerly known as the Special Presidential Security Group (GSSP). FARDC military officials state that the Garde Républicaine is not the responsibility of FARDC, but the Head of State. Apart from Article 140 of the Law on the Army and Defence, no legal stipulation on the DRC's Armed Forces makes provision for the GR as a distinct unit within the national army. In February 2005, President Joseph Kabila passed a decree which appointed the GR's commanding officer and 'repealed any previous provisions contrary' to that decree. The GR is more than 10,000 strong (the ICG said 10,000–15,000 in January 2007), and has better working conditions and is paid regularly, but still commits rapes and robberies nearby their bases.

In an effort to extend his personal control across the country, Joseph Kabila has deployed the GR at key airports, ostensibly in preparation for an impending presidential visit. At the end of 2005, there were Guards deployed in Mbandaka, Kindu, Lubumbashi, Bukavu, Kolwezi, staying many months after the President had left. They are still deployed at Kisangani's Bangoka airport, where they appear to answer to no local commander and have caused trouble with MONUC troops there.

The GR is also supposed to undergo the integration process, but as of January 2007, only one battalion had been announced as being integrated. Formed at a brassage centre in the Kinshasa suburb of Kibomango, the battalion included 800 men, half from the former GSSP and half from the MLC and RCD Goma.

Equipment 

Attempting to list the equipment available to the DRC's land forces is difficult; most figures are unreliable estimates based on known items delivered in the past. The IISS's Military Balance 2007 and Orbat.com's Concise World Armies 2005 give only slightly differing figures however (the figures below are from the IISS Military Balance 2007). Much of the Army's equipment is non-operational due to insufficient maintenance—in 2002 only 20 percent of the Army's armoured vehicles were estimated as being serviceable.
Main Battle Tanks: 30 x Type 59, 20 x T-55, some T-72
Reconnaissance vehicles: 	40+ Type 62 light tanks, 40+ Panhard AML armoured cars, some EE-9 Cascavel
Infantry Fighting Vehicles: 20 BMP-1
Armoured Personnel Carriers: IISS reports M-113, Type 63, and wheeled vehicles including Casspir, Panhard M3, TH 390 Fahd, Wolf Turbo 2
Artillery: 100 field guns, ranging from M116 howitzer 75 mm to Type 59 130 mm, and 30 Type 81 MRL

In addition to these 2007 figures, In March 2010, it was reported that the DRC's land forces had ordered US$80 million worth of military equipment from Ukraine which included 20 T-72 main battle tanks, 100 trucks and various small arms. 20 x T-72 have been reported by World Defence Almanac. Tanks have been used in the Kivus in the 2005-9 period.

In February 2014, Ukraine revealed that it had achieved the first export order for the T-64 tank to the DRC Land Forces for 50 T-64BV-1s.

Rank insignia

Other forces active in the country

United Nations

There are currently large numbers of United Nations troops stationed in the DRC. The United Nations Organization Stabilization Mission in the Democratic Republic of the Congo (MONUSCO)  had a strength of over 19,000 peacekeepers (including 16,998 military personnel) and has a mission of assisting Congolese authorities maintain security. The UN and foreign military aid missions, the most prominent being EUSEC RD Congo, are attempting to assist the Congolese in rebuilding the armed forces, with major efforts being made in trying to assure regular payment of salaries to armed forces personnel and also in military justice. Retired Canadian Lieutenant General Marc Caron also served for a time as Security Sector Reform advisor to the head of MONUC.

Non and Anti-government Forces
Groups of anti-Rwandan government rebels like the FDLR, and other foreign fighters remain inside the DRC. The FDLR which is the greatest concern, was some 6,000 strong, as of July 2007. By late 2010 the FDLR's strength however was estimated at 2,500. 

The other groups are smaller: the Ugandan Lord's Resistance Army, the Ugandan rebel group the Allied Democratic Forces in the remote area of Mt Rwenzori, and the Burundian Parti pour la Libération du Peuple Hutu—Forces Nationales de Liberation (PALIPEHUTU-FNL).

Government Paramilitaries
Finally there is a government paramilitary force, created in 1997 under President Laurent Kabila. The National Service is tasked with providing the army with food and with training the youth in a range of reconstruction and developmental activities. There is not much further information available, and no internet-accessible source details the relationship of the National Service to other armed forces bodies; it is not listed in the constitution. President Kabila, in one of the few comments available, says National Service will provide a gainful activity for street children. Obligatory civil service administered through the armed forces was also proposed under the Mobutu regime during the 'radicalisation' programme of December 1974-January 1975; the FAZ was opposed to the measure and the plan 'took several months to die.'

References

Military of the Democratic Republic of the Congo